Juan Alfredo Pinto Saavedra (born 2 November 1953) was Ambassador of Colombia to India with concurrent accreditation to Iran, Nepal, Sri Lanka, Bangladesh, until 2011, to Indonesia and until 2018 to Turkey. Previous to this appointment, he served in the business sector as President of the Colombian Association of Small and Medium Businesses, ACOPI, co-founder and President of the Socioeconomic and Technological Research Corporation of Colombia, CINSET, Manager of the Bogotá Water and Sewerage Company, EAAB, Vice President of the World Association for Small and Medium Enterprises among other endeavours as well as professor of economic studies in various universities in Colombia.

References

External links
 

1953 births
People from Cundinamarca Department
Living people
Colombian economists
Ambassadors of Colombia to India
Ambassadors of Colombia to Iran
Ambassadors of Colombia to Nepal
Ambassadors of Colombia to Indonesia
Ambassadors of Colombia to Sri Lanka
Ambassadors of Colombia to Bangladesh
Ambassadors of Colombia to Turkey
Jorge Tadeo Lozano University alumni